The Nauan Hazrat Mosque is a mosque in the center of Kokshetau, the capital of Akmola Region, in the northern part of Kazakhstan.

The mosque opened for public use on 16 September 2015. Worshippers are separated by gender during a worship service; females worship on the second floor (balcony), while the males worship on the first floor.

History
The mosque is one of the largest in Kokshetau. The mosque is named after Nauryzbay Talasov (1843—1916), known as a theologian who preached Muslim morality and as an unyielding fighter for the rights of Kazakhs in tsarist Russia.

Design and construction
The construction of the mosque started in March 2010. On September 16, the mosque was officially opened, which supplemented the list of unique objects of the city. During the construction of the mosque, the latest and modern technologies have been used. 

The mosque design is based on a classical Islamic style with traditional Kazakh ornaments. The central hall of the mosque is covered with a huge dome (diameter — , height — ). The height of the four minarets is  making them one of the highest minarets in Akmola Region. The Exterior and interior walls of the mosque are made of aglay, travertine, while the interior is decorated in white marble. There are in total 45 chandeliers.

See also 
Islam in Kazakhstan
List of mosques in Kazakhstan
List of mosques in Europe
List of mosques in Asia

References

External links
Nauan Hazrat Mosque video

Mosques completed in 2015
Mosques in Kokshetau
Religious buildings and structures in Kokshetau
Buildings and structures in Kokshetau
21st-century mosques
Mosques in Kazakhstan